Useful Music is a studio album initially released in May 1999 under the SMG Records label by Josh Joplin Band, and again in January 2001 through Artemis Records after the band had renamed itself Josh Joplin Group following a change in its line-up.  While the album did not enjoy widespread commercial success, it peaked at #22 on the Billboard Independent Albums chart and spawned a moderate hit with its first single, "Camera One", which quickly reached #1 on the Triple A airplay chart, the highest position ever achieved by an independent release at that point (February 2001). Featuring a more rock-edged, radio-friendly sound than most of the other material on Useful Music, the song was also featured in an episode of the comedy series Scrubs (season 1, episode 7, "My Super Ego").

Track listing

Original release (1999)
All songs written by Josh Joplin.

Re-release (2001)
All credits are the same as the original release except where noted.
 "Matter"
 "Gravity"
 "Here I Am"
 "Undone"
 "Camera One" – 4:33
 Producer: Jerry Harrison
 Engineer: Karl Derfler
 Mixer: Tom Lord-Alge
 Mastering: Ted Jensen
 "I've Changed"
 "Trailways"
 "Who's Afraid of Thomas Wolfe?"
 "Phil Ochs"
 "Superstar"
 "Human"
 "Dutch Wonderland"
 "I've Changed (alternate version)" – 4:21
 Producer: Peter Collins
 Engineer: F. Reid Shippen
 Mastering: Greg Calbi

Album credits

Personnel
 Kenny Aronoff – drums
 Allen Broyles – backing vocals, piano, trumpet, organ, accordion, harmonium, keyboards, Wurlitzer electric piano
 Jason Buecker – percussion, drums, backing vocals
 Ani Cordero – backing vocals
 Deb Davis – electric guitar ("Trailways")
 Joe Gore – electric guitar
 Carl Herrgesell – electric guitar
 Danny Howes – electric guitar
 Clay Johnson – backing vocals
 Josh Joplin – lead and backing vocals, Rhodes electric piano, harmonica, acoustic guitar
 David Kostiner – drums
 Diana Mangano – backing vocals
 Geoff Melkonian – backing vocals, electric bass, double bass, viola
 Shawn Mullins – guitar, piano, backing vocals
 Pamela Sixfin – violin
 Eric Taylor – drums ("Camera One")
 Kris Wilkinson – string arrangement

Production
 John Bentham – photography
 Chris Bilheimer – art direction
 Allen Broyles – producer ("Phil Ochs")
 Greg Calbi – mastering (all tracks except "Matter" and "Camera One")
 Matt Chiaravalle – mixer ("Here I Am", "Trailways", and "Superstar")
 Peter Collins – producer ("I've Changed (alternate version)")
 Karl Derfler – engineer ("Matter" and "Camera One")
 Russ Fowler – engineer (all tracks except "Matter", "Camera One", and "I've Changed (alternate version)"), mixer ("Far Away", "Phil Ochs", "Who's Afraid of Thomas Wolfe?", "Human", and "Dutch Wonderland")
 Daniel Glass – executive producer
 Jerry Harrison – producer ("Matter" and "Camera One")
 J. Reid Hunter – legal
 Ted Jensen – mastering ("Matter" and "Camera One")
 Josh Joplin – producer ("Phil Ochs")
 Matt Lively – illustration
 Tom Lord-Alge – mixer ("Matter" and "Camera One")
 Alex Lowe – engineer ("Gravity")
 Shawn Mullins – producer (all tracks except "Matter", "Phil Ochs", "Camera One", and "I've Changed (alternate version)")
 Phil Nicolo – mixer ("Gravity," "Undone," and "I've Changed")
 Charles “Chicky” Reeves – engineer ("Phil Ochs")
 Anthony J. Resta – drum and keyboard programmer
 F. Reid Shippen – engineer ("I've Changed (alternate version)")

Sources

External links
 Useful Music at Discogs
 Useful Music at Billboard.com

Josh Joplin albums
1999 albums
Artemis Records albums
Albums produced by Shawn Mullins
Albums produced by Jerry Harrison